Shirley Rosemary Stelfox (11 April 1941 – 7 December 2015) was an English actress, known for her portrayal of the character Edna Birch, a moralising busybody in the ITV soap opera Emmerdale, and as Rose, the vampy sister of the snobby and overbearing Hyacinth Bucket in the first season of the comedy series Keeping Up Appearances.

Early life
Stelfox was born at Dukinfield, Cheshire, on 11 April 1941. She suffered from bilateral amblyopia, which left her short-sighted. She studied at RADA, where her classmates included Edward Fox, John Thaw, and Sarah Miles. She was playing in pantomimes at the Old Chapel, Dukinfield, and in productions during the years of her study the town's Lakes Road Secondary School.

Career

Television 
After the Royal Academy of Dramatic Art Stelfox started straight at the BBC in a play called The Case Before You in which she played a 15 year old arsonist - where the prompter did not respond to her long pauses. In December 1960, she appeared in her first episode of Coronation Street. She would later play many different characters in the world-famous soap opera, including, in 1983, running a dating agency in which one of her customers was the entrance cue for Jack Duckworth. In 1983, Stelfox appeared in an episode of Grange Hill appearing as a Secretary at the school. She was the first actress to play Hyacinth Bucket's randy sister Rose in the first series of Keeping Up Appearances, but was later replaced by Mary Millar. She appeared in several other well-known television series, including the successful Wicked Women, Making Out with Margi Clarke, Mrs Parkin in Heartbeat, - and Jean in Common as Muck, Juliet Bravo, Coronation Street, The Bill and Crossroads, and Inspector Morse,
She played Jane Healy, Melanie Owen's mother, in an episode of EastEnders. She appeared in the short-lived series Albion Market.
Stelfox had a long life in different soap operas, briefly appearing in Crossroads (as a police officer), Owen MD and Family Affairs. She had played in Brookside as Madge Richmond (1986–1987), where she depicted two-timed the widowed pensioner Ralph Hardwick (Ray Dunbobbin), and in 1999 she appeared in two episodes of EastEnders as Jane Healy. Among many others of one-off parts, she played as Alice Hobson in Hobson’s Choice (1967), Helen in Civvies (1992), Julie Clegg in Three Seven Eleven (1993–1994), Jean in Common as Muck (1994) and Mrs Nolan in Lucy Sullivan Is Getting Married (1999–2000).

Film roles 
Stelfox played the mother of Julie Walters and Victoria Wood in the TV film Pat and Margaret (1994). But her best-known film role came as the "$2.00 Prostitute" in Nineteen Eighty-Four, a film adaptation of the George Orwell novel, starring John Hurt and Richard Burton. Somewhat typecast as a prostitute she played another in Terry Jones's comedy Personal Services (1987) based on the life of Madame Cyn, the brothel owner who entertained celebrities and politicians.

Stage 
On the West End stage, Stelfox played Sue Lawson in Not Now, Darling (Strand theatre, 1968) and Phoebe in Toad of Toad Hall (Duke of York's theatre, 1970).
Stelfox portrayed a stand-up comedian in Stand Up Sweetie Pie, directed by June Brown, the stalwart of EastEnders, who must have come across each other on set; it premièred in 1993 at the Nottingham Playhouse, rather than in the West End. She played a role of spidery Regan in King Lear at the Ludlow Festival in 1972 and at the Connaught Theatre, played Lady Macbeth in 1973, Titania in A Midsummer Night's Dream in 1978 and Yelena in Uncle Vanya in 1974.

Personal life
Stelfox was married to Keith Edmundson for three years. She had a daughter, Helena, from this marriage. She later married actor Don Henderson in 1979 and they were together until his death from throat cancer in 1997. They lived in Stratford-upon-Avon, where she helped bring up Henderson's two children from his first marriage. She moved to rural Nottinghamshire after Henderson's death.

Stelfox died on 7 December 2015, aged 74, four weeks after being diagnosed with terminal cancer.

Filmography

References

External links

Shirley Stelfox at the British Film Institute
Shirley Stelfox (Aveleyman)

1941 births
2015 deaths
Deaths from cancer in England
Deaths from ovarian cancer
People from Dukinfield
20th-century English actresses
21st-century English actresses
English television actresses
English soap opera actresses
English film actresses
Alumni of RADA
Actresses from Cheshire